The Musique de l’Artillerie sometimes referred to informally as the Music of 9-9 or M-ART is a military band of French Army falls under the Sud-Est territorial region. It consists of 50 musicians, who perform at official protocol ceremonies as well as public relations events for the Army.

It performs throughout the south-eastern quarter of France participates in national events and events abroad, particularly numerous international festivals. It is located in the Gerland District of Lyon and is currently led by Chief Musician Jean-Claude Leberruyer while being assisted by the Drum Major, Chief Warrant Officer Jean-Michel Gatta. 

The band performs in different formations:
 Parade Band (including a Fanfare band and drummers at the front ranks)
 Concert Band
 Dixieland Band
 Small ensembles (quartets, quintet, wind ensemble, and brass ensemble)

The small ensembles also organize gala evenings and concerts for the benefit of civil and military authorities.

History

Lineage
The band has roots that date back to 1759.

Band of GMR5 (Grouping of Regional Means No. 5)
Band of the CMD (Circonscription Militaire de Défense)
Band of the 22nd Infantry Regiment
Band of the 22nd Infantry Battalion
Band of the Army Sud-Est Region
Infantry Band (?-1 August 2016)
Artillery Band (1 August 2016-Present)

When it took its current name, it then was integrated into the Army Music Command.

Notable activities
The Musique de L’Artillerie gives the Concert of the Military Governor of Lyon every year, for the benefit of army casualties in front of a parterre of 2000 people.
In August 2011, it took part in the Ystad International Military Tattoo.
In June 2013, it took part in the Sevastopol International Arts Festival.
In January 2016, the band accompanied a ceremonial contingent from the 35th Infantry Regiment on the Rajpath in New Delhi for the 67th Indian Republic Day parade.
In July 2019, the band took part in the Royal Edinburgh Military Tattoo.

See also
 191st Army Band
 Royal Artillery Band
 Royal Canadian Artillery Band
 French Republican Guard Band

References

French military bands
Music in Lyon
Military units and formations established in 1759
1759 establishments in France